The Liberal People's Party is a political party in Denmark.

History
The party was founded by the two former municipal council members of Danish People's Party, Freddie and Kim Madsen. Upon foundation, the party announced its interested in running in the 2015 general election, but did not manage to do so.

References

Liberal parties in Denmark
Political parties established in 2014
Nationalist parties in Denmark
2014 establishments in Denmark